Cheryl Taplin (born September 2, 1972 in Seattle) is a retired American track and field athlete who specialized in sprinting events. She represented her country at two consecutive World Championships, in 1997 and 1999. Taplin was elected to the Louisiana State University Hall of Fame in 2006 and the Penn Relays Wall of Fame in 2014.

Taplin is currently the Executive Assistant to the Head Coach, and the Assistant Director of Operations, for the University of Southern California Football Team. She is also working on her master's degree in Communication Management at USC.

Competition record

Personal bests
Outdoor
100 meters – 11.07 (+1.8 m/s, Baton Rouge 1994)
200 meters – 22.79 (+0.4 m/s, Uniondale 1998)

Indoor
60 meters – 7.17 (Atlanta 1999)

References

All-Athletics profile

1972 births
Living people
Track and field athletes from Seattle
American female sprinters
World Athletics Championships athletes for the United States
LSU Tigers track and field athletes
Universiade medalists in athletics (track and field)
Goodwill Games medalists in athletics
Universiade gold medalists for the United States
Medalists at the 1993 Summer Universiade
Medalists at the 1995 Summer Universiade
Competitors at the 1998 Goodwill Games
Competitors at the 1994 Goodwill Games
21st-century American women